ATCC may refer to:

 American Type Culture Collection
 Asociación de Trabajadores Campesinos del Carare (Association of Peasant Workers of the Carare)
 Asian Touring Car Championship
 Air traffic control center
 Australian Touring Car Championship, the predecessor to the V8 Supercar Championship Series
 Ayutthaya Women's Volleyball Club A.T.C.C., Thailand